Hjartarson is a surname of Icelandic origin, meaning son of Hjörtur. In Icelandic names, the name is not strictly a surname, but a patronymic. The name refers to:

Grétar Hjartarson (born 1977), Icelandic footballer
Jóhann Hjartarson (born 1963), Icelandic chess grandmaster
Snorri Hjartarson (1906–1986), Icelandic poet

Icelandic-language surnames